Hisham Inamullah Khan is a Pakistani politician who is the current Provincial Minister of Khyber Pakhtunkhwa for Health, in office from 29 August 2018 to July 2021. He had been a member of the Provincial Assembly of Khyber Pakhtunkhwa from August 2018 to January 2023.

Political career
He was elected to the Provincial Assembly of Khyber Pakhtunkhwa as a candidate of Pakistan Tehreek-e-Insaf from Constituency PK-92 (Lakki Marwat-II) in 2018 Pakistani general election.

On 29 August 2018, he was inducted into the provincial Khyber Pakhtunkhwa cabinet of Chief Minister Mahmood Khan and was appointed as Provincial Minister of Khyber Pakhtunkhwa for Health.

References

Living people
Pakistan Tehreek-e-Insaf MPAs (Khyber Pakhtunkhwa)
Year of birth missing (living people)